Trioza alacris is a sap-sucking hemipteran bug in the family Triozidae which creates galls on the leaves of Laurus species. It is found in Europe.

Description of the gall
Trioza alacris causes the edges of leaves to thicken and roll downwards forming pale, elongated pouches. The galls can house two generations in a summer, of up to thirty pale-green nymphs, which are covered in a white wax. Adults can also be found in the gall. The adults usually overwinter in leaf litter but can also spend the winter in the gall. Species of Laurus galled include the Azores laurel (Laurus azorica), bay tree (Laurus nobilis), Laurus novocanariensis and Persea indica.

References

Triozidae
Hemiptera of Europe
Gall-inducing insects
Insects described in 1861